The Giant of Metropolis is a 1961 color Italian fantasy adventure film that was produced by Decio Salvi and Emimmo Salvi, directed by Umberto Scarpelli, that stars Gordon Mitchell and Bella Cortez.

Plot
Muscleman Obro travels to the sinful capital of Atlantis to rebuke its godlessness and hubris and becomes involved in the battle against its evil lord Yotar and his hideous super-science schemes.

Cast

Gordon Mitchell as Obro
Bella Cortez as La principessa Mecede
Roldano Lupi as Il re Yotar
Carlo Angeletti ("Marietto") as Elmos
Omero Gargano as Il vecchio saggio
Mario Meniconi as Il padre di Obro
Carlo Tamberlani as Il padre di Yotar
Luigi Moneta as Il primo ministro
Ugo Sasso as Il capitano delle guardie nere
Renato Terra as Il giovane scienzato
Carlo Enrici as Assistente dello scienziato
Leopoldo Savona as Danzatore
Furio Meniconi as Egon
Liana Orfei as Queen Texen

External links

1961 films
1960s science fiction adventure films
1960s fantasy adventure films
Italian fantasy adventure films
Italian science fiction adventure films
Peplum films
1960s Italian-language films
Films set in Atlantis
Sword and sandal films
Films scored by Armando Trovajoli
1960s Italian films